Pamphilius is a genus of leaf-rolling sawflies within the Symphyta belonging to the family Pamphiliidae.

Description
Body is usually black with yellowish spots on the head. Legs are yellow and wings are transparent. Tarsal claws have one apical and subapical tooth. Mandibles are large and sickle-shaped. Adults can be found from May until June.

Larvae may be solitary or form a colony, mainly feeding on deciduous trees. Main host plants are Rosaceae and Betulaceae, others are Salicaceae, Aceraceae, Caprifoliaceae, Fagaceae, Cornaceae and Juglandaceae.

Distribution
Species of this genus can be found in North America and in Eurasia.

Habitat
These species prefer hedge rows.

List of species 
This genus includes about 115 species.

 Pamphilius albopictus (C. G. Thomson, 1871)
 Pamphilius alnicola Ermolenko, 1973
 Pamphilius alnivorus Shinohara, 2005
 Pamphilius archiducalis Konow, 1897
 Pamphilius armeniacus Shinohara, 1988
 Pamphilius aucupariae Vikberg, 1971
 Pamphilius aurantiacus (Giraud, 1857)
 Pamphilius balteatus (Fallén, 1808)
 Pamphilius basilaris Shinohara, 1982
 Pamphilius benesi Shinohara, 1985
 Pamphilius betulae (Linné, 1758)
 Pamphilius borisi Beneš, 1972
 Pamphilius brevicornis Hellén, 1948
 Pamphilius burquei (Provancher, 1878)
 Pamphilius caucasicus Gussakovskij, 1935
 Pamphilius cilix Konow, 1897
 Pamphilius confusus Shinohara, 2005
 Pamphilius convexus Shinohara, 1988
 Pamphilius coreanus Takeuchi, 1938
 Pamphilius croceus Shinohara, 1986
 Pamphilius daisenus Takeuchi, 1938
 Pamphilius faustus (Klug, 1808)
 Pamphilius flavipectus Shinohara, 2005
 Pamphilius foveatus Shinohara, Dong & Naito, 1998
 Pamphilius fumipennis (Curtis, 1831)
 Pamphilius gracilis Shinohara, 1985
 Pamphilius gyllenhali (Dahlbom, 1835)
 Pamphilius heecheonparki Shinohara, 1998
 Pamphilius hilaris (Eversmann, 1847)
 Pamphilius himalayanus Shinohara & Singh, 1989
 Pamphilius histrio Latreille, 1812
 Pamphilius hortorum (Klug, 1808)
 Pamphilius ignymontiensis Lacourt, 1973
 Pamphilius inanitus (Villers, 1789)
 Pamphilius infuscatus Middlekauff, 1964
 Pamphilius ishikawai Shinohara, 1979
 Pamphilius itoi Shinohara, 1985
 Pamphilius japonicus Shinohara, 1985
 Pamphilius jucundus (Eversmann, 1847)
 Pamphilius kamikochensis Takeuchi, 1930
 Pamphilius kashmirensis Beneš, 1971
 Pamphilius kimi Shinohara, 1997
 Pamphilius komonensis Takeuchi, 1930
 Pamphilius kontuniemii Shinohara, 2003
 Pamphilius kyutekparki Shinohara, 1991
 Pamphilius lanatus Beneš, 1982
 Pamphilius latifrons (Fallén, 1808)
 Pamphilius leleji Shinohara & Taeger, 2007
 Pamphilius leucocephalus Takeuchi, 1938
 Pamphilius lobatus Maa, 1950
 Pamphilius marginatus (Lepeletier, 1823)
 Pamphilius masao Shinohara, 2005
 Pamphilius maximus Shinohara, 1995
 Pamphilius middlekauffi Shinohara & D. R. Smith, 1983
 Pamphilius minor Shinohara & Xiao, 2006
 Pamphilius montanus Shinohara, 1985
 Pamphilius nakagawai Takeuchi, 1930
 Pamphilius naokoae Shinohara, 1999
 Pamphilius nemoralis (Linné, 1758)
 Pamphilius nigrifemoratus Shinohara & Taeger, 1990
 Pamphilius nigropilosus Shinohara, Naito & Huang, 1988
 Pamphilius nitidiceps Shinohara, 1998
 Pamphilius norimbergensis Enslin, 1917
 Pamphilius ochreatus (Say, 1836)
 Pamphilius ochreipes (Cresson, 1880)
 Pamphilius ochrostigma Shinohara, 2001
 Pamphilius ocreatus (Say, 1836)
 Pamphilius opacus Shinohara, 1999
 Pamphilius pacificus (Norton, 1869)
 Pamphilius palachei (Ashmead, 1902)
 Pamphilius palliceps Shinohara & Xiao, 2006
 Pamphilius pallidimacula (Norton, 1869)
 Pamphilius pallidipes (Zetterstedt, 1838)
 Pamphilius pallidus Shinohara, 1988
 Pamphilius pallimacula (Norton, 1869)
 Pamphilius pallipes (Zetterstedt, 1838)
 Pamphilius persicum MacGillivray, 1907
 Pamphilius phyllisae Middlekauff, 1964
 Pamphilius pictifrons Gussakovskij, 1935
 Pamphilius planifrons Beneš, 1976
 Pamphilius politiceps Shinohara & Yuan, 2004
 Pamphilius pugnax Konow, 1897
 Pamphilius pullatus (Cresson, 1880)
 Pamphilius rhoae Shinohara, 1988
 Pamphilius rileyi (Cresson, 1880)
 Pamphilius sapporensis (Matsumura, 1912)
 Pamphilius semicinctus (Norton, 1862)
 Pamphilius shengi Wei, 1999
 Pamphilius silvaticus (Linné, 1758)
 Pamphilius sinensis Shinohara, Dong & Naito, 1998
 Pamphilius smithii W. F. Kirby, 1882
 Pamphilius stramineipes (Hartig, 1837)
 Pamphilius sulphureipes W. F. Kirby, 1882
 Pamphilius sylvanus (Stephens, 1835)
 Pamphilius sylvarum (Stephens, 1835)
 Pamphilius takeuchii Beneš, 1972
 Pamphilius thorwaldi Kontuniemi, 1946
 Pamphilius tibetanus Shinohara, Naito & Huang, 1988
 Pamphilius togashii Beneš, 1976 [not 1977]
 Pamphilius tricolor Beneš, 1974
 Pamphilius turkomanus Shinohara, 1991
 Pamphilius uniformis Shinohara & Zhou, 2006
 Pamphilius uniunguis Middlekauff, 1964
 Pamphilius ussuriensis Shinohara, 1988
 Pamphilius vafer (Linné, 1767)
 Pamphilius varius (Lepeletier, 1823)
 Pamphilius venustus (F. Smith, 1874)
 Pamphilius vernalis Middlekauff, 1964
 Pamphilius virescens Malaise, 1931
 Pamphilius viridipes Achterberg & Aartsen, 1986
 Pamphilius viridulus Shinohara, 2001
 Pamphilius volatilis (F. Smith, 1874)
 Pamphilius zhelochovtsevi Beneš, 1974
 Pamphilius zhongi Wei, 2002
 Pamphilius zinovjevi Shinohara, 1988

References 

 Shinohara A. Leaf-rolling sawflies of the Pamphilius vafer complex (Hymenoptera, Pamphiliidae) // Natn. Sci. Mus. Monograph. 2005. N. 27. P. 1–116.
 ECatSym — Electronic World Catalog of Symphyta
  Pamphilius — www.nic.funet.fi
 Biolib
 Fauna Europaea
 J.K. Lindsey Commanster

Sawfly genera
Sawflies